Joan Alice Katherine Grigg, Baroness Altrincham ( Dickson-Poynder; 11 September 1897 – 1987) was a British organiser of maternity and nursing services in Kenya. She disagreed with the Governor of Kenya (her husband) about race issues and she established medical facilities for all races.

Life 
Grigg was born in the country house called Hartham Park near Corsam in Wiltshire. She was the first and last child of Ann (born Beauclerk) and John Dickson-Poynder, 1st Baron Islington. Her father volunteered his time to a hospital and her mother took an interest in nursing. In 1910, her father became Baron Islington and Governor of New Zealand.

During the First World War she became a nurse after being one of the thousands who volunteered for the Volunteer Aid Detachment. Aged nineteen, she was first based in Canterbury where she worked in a military hospital before she moved out to work in a hospital in Rouen in 1917. She went on to work with the French army before the war ended.

In 1923 she married a Liberal Member of Parliament Edward Grigg. In 1925 her husband was made Governor of Kenya. He was tasked with merging Uganda, Tanganyika and Kenya but ended up creating fine buildings and a steady administration that attracted investment. He believed that Africans were not ready to rule themselves and his administration took little interest in creating hospitals or health care.

Like her parents and building on her wartime experience she took an interest in hospitals in Kenya (and this reflected well on her husband). She disagreed with her husbands views of white rule. She found the social life at Government House in Nairobi dull although she was befriended by Karen Blixen who was then a Danish farmer (but who would in time write Out of Africa about her time in Kenya.) 

She decided she was going to do something and she created the Lady Grigg Welfare League and the Lady Grigg Maternity''' in 1926 (or 1927) in Pumwani. She intended to create nursing and midwifery services to Kenyans irrespective of their race. That same year the league funded a welfare home for Arab and African children in Mombasa. The facility in Pumwani in Nairobi was also known as the African Maternity and Child Welfare Hospital and Training Centre. She wrote a letter to The Times which attracted donations but may were earmarked for European hospitals. The league had created hostel facilities for trainee nurses for Europeans, but had also established welfare facilities for Indians and importantly maternity facilities for Africans. African women could have difficult and sometimes fatal births to female circumcision which was practised at that time.

Death and legacy
Grigg died in Tormarton Court. The Maternity unit she founded in Nairobi is now much expanded and is called the Pumwani Maternity Hospital''.

Private life
She married the politician Edward Grigg.

They had three children:
 John Edward Poynder Grigg, 2nd Baron Altrincham (15 April 1924 – 31 December 2001), a journalist and author
 Hon. Annabel Desirée Grigg, (b. 19 November 1931), 
 Anthony Ulrick David Dundas Grigg, 3rd Baron Altrincham (b. 12 January 1934).

References 

1897 births
1987 deaths
Wives of knights
People from Wiltshire
Kenyan philanthropists
British emigrants to Kenya